The Science in Science Fiction is a book by David Langford, Peter Nicholls and Brian Stableford published in 1982.

Plot summary
The Science in Science Fiction is a book featuring twelve illustrated chapters on such subjects as Space Flight, Energy, Aliens, Time Travel and Intelligent Machines.

Reception
Dave Pringle reviewed The Science in Science Fiction for Imagine magazine, and stated that "I hope every would-be SF writer in the land reads this book and comes to the realisation that raw imagination and an ability with words are not enough; a modicum of knowledge has always been necessary to the creation of worthwhile science-fiction."

Reviews
Review by Gregory Benford (1983) in Locus, #267 April 1983
Review by Gene DeWeese (1983) in Science Fiction Review, Summer 1983

References

Science fiction books